Gábor Máté may refer to:
 Gábor Máté (athlete) (born 1979), Hungarian discus thrower
 Gábor Máté (actor) (born 1955), Hungarian actor
 Gabor Maté (born 1944), Hungarian-born Canadian physician and author